Maureen Ursenbach Beecher (born March 19, 1935) is a historian and editor of the history of the Church of Jesus Christ of Latter-day Saints (LDS Church). She studied at Brigham Young University (BYU) and the University of Utah. She worked in the History Department for the LDS Church from 1972 to 1980, and became a professor of English at BYU in 1981 while continuing her work in Mormon history at the Joseph Fielding Smith Institute for Church History. She published a popular book of Eliza R. Snow's writings.

Early life and education
Beecher was born on March 19, 1935, in Calgary, Alberta, Canada, the youngest of four children. Her parents were Charles Ursenbach and Margaret Lucille Harvey. She attended Sunalta School in Calgary, followed by studies at University of Alberta, Calgary and Edmonton branches to finish her secondary education. She studied at BYU majoring in mathematics and English and graduating in 1958. She served as a missionary for the LDS Church later in 1958 in the Swiss-Austrian mission. After returning from her mission, she studied at the University of Utah, receiving her master's in English in 1966 and her PhD in comparative literature in 1973.

As a historian
Prior to her research on Mormon studies, Maureen Uresenbach Beecher served as the managing editor of the Western Humanities Review. Beecher was an editor and senior research associate in the History Department for the LDS Church from 1972 to 1980. She was the founding president of the Association for Mormon Letters in 1976. In 1981 she took a position as an English professor at BYU while also a research professor in the Joseph Fielding Smith Institute for Church History. Beecher retired from BYU in 1997. She was the general editor for the Life Writings of Frontier Women series and published two books on Eliza R. Snow, including a definitive edition of Snow's writings, The Personal Writings of Eliza Roxcy Snow. The book won two awards and was popular, selling out of its first printing. Beecher has been a leading advocate for women's studies through her research on Snow and other Mormon women and Beecher served on the editorial board for Dialogue: A Journal of Mormon Thought. Beecher writes, edits, and promotes Global Forum projects in Ottawa, Canada.

Personal life
Beecher married Dale Beecher. They later divorced. She is retired and lives in Ottawa, Ontario, Canada.

Awards
1992 Best Biography Award, Mormon History Association
1994 Leonard J. Arrington Award, Mormon History Association
1995 AML Award for biography, for The Personal Writings of Eliza Roxcy Snow
1996 Best Book Award, Mormon History Association
1996 BYU Women's Research Institute Best Article Award

Notes

Sources
Review of Beecher's papers of Eliza R. Snow that mentions some biographical details

External links 
 
 
 Bookfinder list of writings

1935 births
American Latter Day Saint writers
American academics of English literature
Brigham Young University faculty
Historians of the Latter Day Saint movement
Living people
Women historians
Latter Day Saints from Utah
Writers from Calgary
Harold B. Lee Library-related 20th century articles